Rhys Walker (born 26 January 1994) is a badminton player from England. He started paying badminton at age 8, then in 2013, he won bronze medal at the European Junior Badminton Championships in men's singles event.

Achievements

European Junior Championships 
Boys' singles

BWF International Challenge/Series 
Men's singles

Men's doubles

  BWF International Challenge tournament
  BWF International Series tournament
  BWF Future Series tournament

References

External links 
 

1994 births
Living people
Sportspeople from Nuneaton
English male badminton players